Immensa aeterni Dei ("The immeasurable [wisdom of] the eternal God") is an apostolic constitution in the form of a papal bull issued by Pope Sixtus V on 22 January 1588. The constitution reorganized the Roman Curia, establishing permanent congregations of cardinals to advise the pope on various subjects.

Content
The one role of the document was to provide instruction in condemning or correcting literature which were against Catholic doctrine. The document also had the authority to give permission for selected individuals to read books which were forbidden. It has since been superseded, most recently by Pope John Paul II's constitution Pastor Bonus.

The Constitution also created the Congregation of Rites, which at that time included jurisdiction over Causes of the Saints.

Congregations
Immensa aeterni Dei called for the formation of 15 permanent congregations:
 Congregation of the Inquisition
 Congregation of the Segnatura
 Congregation for the Erection of Churches and Consistorial Provisions
 Congregation for Sacred Rites and Ceremonies 
Congregation of the Index of Forbidden Books
 Congregation of the Council 
 Congregation of Regulars
 Congregation of Bishops 
 Congregation of the Vatican Press 
 Congregation of the Annona, for the provisioning of Rome and the provinces
 Congregation of the Navy
 Congregation of the Public Welfare 
 Congregation of the Sapienza 
 Congregation of Roads, Bridges, and Waters 
 Congregation of State Consultations

References

External links
 

Apostolic constitutions
Documents of Pope Sixtus V
1588 works
Reforms of the Roman Curia
History of the Roman Curia